Chocolates and Cigarettes is the first EP by Australian singer-songwriter duo Angus and Julia Stone.

"Mango Tree" and "Babylon" were used in the American television dramas Life and Army Wives, respectively.  Giorgio Armani also sampled "Paper Aeroplane" for his 2008–09 winter collection runway. "Eye of the Storm", the third single from Bliss n Eso's album Flying Colours, uses the main riff and idea from the song "Paper Aeroplane".

Track listing

References

2006 debut EPs
Angus & Julia Stone albums
Independiente Records albums